The Greek Heroic Age, in mythology, is the period between the coming of the Greeks to Thessaly and the Greek return from Troy. It was demarcated as one of the five Ages of Man by Hesiod. The period spans roughly six generations; the heroes denoted by the term are superhuman, though not divine, and are celebrated in the literature of Homer.

The Greek heroes can be grouped into an approximate chronology, based on events such as the Argonautic expedition and the Trojan War. Over this course in time, many heroes in Greece, such as Heracles, Achilles, Hector and Perseus, came to be prominent figures in Greek mythology.

Early heroes
Many of the early Greek heroes were descended from the gods and were part of the founding narratives of various city-states. They also became the ancestors of later heroes. The Phoenician prince Cadmus, a grandson of Poseidon, was the first Greek hero and the founder of Thebes.

Perseus, famous for his exploits well before the days of his great-grandson, Heracles, was the son of Zeus. Perseus beheaded the Medusa, saved Andromeda from the sea monster Cetus, and was the legendary founder of Mycenae.

Aeacus was also a son of Zeus. Bellerophon was descended from the nymph Orseis. Oenomaus, king of Pisa, in the Peloponnese, was the son of Ares.

Among these early heroes the three - Cadmus, Perseus and Bellerophon - were considered the greatest Greek heroes and slayers of monsters before the days of Heracles.

Heroes in Art 
Heroes in the Greek Heroic Age are often depicted on vases, expressing a portion of their story. Greek Hero Heracles is a popular icon among vases and paintings in early art. Moments in history from this period are also captured in statues, such as Perseus with the head of Medusa, the Statue of Achilles, and the Pasquino Group. Polykleitos of Argos is one famous Greek Sculptor that has transformed Greek myth through bronze and marble sculptures, and primarily created a system for reproductions of art to occur.

Argonauts
The myth of Jason and the Golden Fleece is one of the oldest stories of a hero's quest. Jason sailed on the Argo, and those who accompanied him were called the "Argonauts". Their mission was to travel to the kingdom of Colchis, on the Black Sea, to obtain the "Golden Fleece", a symbol of authority and kingship. With it, Jason would become king of Iolcos in Thessaly.
  
The Argonauts:

Calydonian boar hunt

A monstrous boar was sent by Artemis to ravage the region of Calydon in Aetolia because its king neglected to honour her in his rites to the gods. King Oeneus sent messengers seeking the best hunters in Greece, offering them the boar's pelt and tusks as a prize. A number of heroes responded, including Atalanta, Castor and Pollux, Jason, Laertes, Lynceus, Meleager (the host and boar killer), Nestor, Peleus, Phoenix, and Theseus. Many of them were also the "Argonauts". One notable exception was Heracles, who vanquished his own Goddess-sent Erymanthian boar separately.

Others

Generation of Oedipus 
(about two generations before Troy)

The story of Oedipus is the basis of a trilogy of plays by Sophocles, however, similar stories have been traced to cultures all over the world.

Generation of the Seven against Thebes 
(about a generation before Troy)

Oedipus places a curse upon his sons Eteocles and Polynices. The underlying theme in the story of the "Seven Against Thebes" is the fulfilment of that curse. Although the brothers had agreed to share the rule of Thebes, when it is time for Eteocles to step aside he refuses, and Polynices brings an army against his beloved city to enforce his claim. In Aeschylus' play the concept of the individual vs. community becomes a central theme. In the Phoenissae (The Phoenician Women), patriotism is a significant theme.

Generation of the Trojan War 
See Trojan War and Epigoni.

Gregory Nagy sees mortality as the "dominant theme in the stories of ancient Greek heroes." In heading for Troy, Achilles opts for a short life, leaving a memory of being immortal and renown over a long peaceful life in relative obscurity.

Greek Heroes in The Iliad 

Face of the Trojan War, Achilles, helped escalate the war after killing the Trojan Prince Hector. A description of the Trojan War is given to audiences through a telling of the myth in the form of a poem by Greek poet Homer, titled The Iliad,

Generation after the Trojan War

See also 
 Bronze Age collapse

References

External links 
 Rosenberg, Karen. "Those Greek Heroes, Sometimes Behaving Badly", The New York Times, October 21, 2010

Greek mythology
Periodization